Sawer can refer to:

 Sawer, India, town in the Indian state of Madhya Pradesh
 Sawer, Pakistan, village in the Punjab province of Pakistan
 David Sawer (born 1961), British composer
 Marian Sawer (born 1946), Australian political scientist